Posts (formerly Posts Summit) is an Unincorporated community in the Big Sur region of Monterey County, California. The steep road from the Big Sur River to Posts was formerly named Posts Grade.

Origins 

The location is named for descendants of William Brainard Post who first arrived from Essex, Connecticut, as an 18-year-old in Monterey via ship in 1848. W. B. was the son of a retired sea captain Alvah Post and Anna Brainard. He hired on as a cabin boy on The Brooklyn. When it arrived at Magdalena Bay, Mexico, a whaling port, he went ashore with a friend, only to find the next day that their ship had sailed. They walked barefoot to La Paz, where they were able to board The Mizzen Top, a government ship headed for  Yerba Buena, California (later renamed San Francisco). The boys landed at Monterey.

When the California gold rush started in 1849, W. B. joined the rush to Sacramento, but he returned just as poor as when he had left.  Between 1848 and 1850 Post worked at a shore whaling station at Point Lobos, south of the Carmel River, where Native Americans had previously lived for thousands of years. There were no white settlers along the coast and virtually all of the Native America Esselen people has been forced into the Mission system. The few that survived had long since filtered into the local ranches as ranch hands. He worked aboard a whaling ship for six months.

Post family 

After returning to the Monterey area, W.B. found work in upper Carmel Valley at the ranch of James Meadows. Meadows had married Loretta Onesimo, one of the last Rumsen Ohlone and native speakers of the Ohlone language. W.B. met Loretta's sister Anselma and they were married in 1850. Post earned a reputation as a skilled bear and deer hunter in the Big Sur region and he traded in hides and buckskin. This work drew him north to the Elkhorn Slough on Monterey Bay where Capt. Charles Moss was establishing a landing and wharf to handle the emerging grain trade in the Salinas Valley in the early l860's. W.B. opened one of the first grain warehouses along the coast at Moss Landing. Flat bottom boats brought grain from all over the Salinas Valley to the Slough and unloaded at Post’s warehouse. W.B. was as agent for the steamship company of Goodall, Nelson and Perkins. The success of the shipping point stimulated the growth of Castroville, one of Monterey County's first municipalities, which served to support Moss Landing commerce.

W.B. then built the first butcher shop in Castroville in 1870 where their two daughters Mary and Ellen were born.

Big Sur home 

The family moved to the Soberanes Ranch in Big Sur where W.B was foreman. Ezequiel Soberanes operated a prosperous cattle and sheep ranch for 24 years in the area now known as Garrapata State Park. The Soberanes family, locally famed for their musical talents, offered their hospitality to other ranchers traveling along the coast to Monterey.

The Post family added two sons, Frank and Joe, while living at the Soberanes Ranch. The family divided its time between their homestead and the Soberanes Ranch until 1877, when son Joe constructed a two-story addition that provided room for the entire family. W.B. raised cattle, hogs, and apples on the land and sold his products to stores in Monterey County. He also sold tanbark to George and William Notley. The tanbark was harvested from the isolated trees inland, corded, brought out by mule back or using wooden sleds, and loaded by cable onto waiting vessels anchored offshore at Notley's Landing. The bark was used to manufacture tannic acid, necessary to the growing leather tanning industry located in Santa Cruz, across the bay from Monterey.

Limited access 

The ranch was initially at the end of a horse trail from Monterey. The trail was gradually improved into a road and Monterey County declared the Old Coast Road a public road in 1885. In 1886 Charles Bixby, who owned land  to the north of the Post Ranch, improved the road between his ranch and Monterey, and W.B. extended it further south to his ranch. A son, Joseph William Post, was born on the ranch. In 1888, Joseph Post won a government contract to build a road to connect the road his father built and Point Sur,  the future site of the Point Sur Lighthouse.

In 1920, the  trip from Carmel in a light spring wagon pulled by two horses could be completed in about 11 hours. A lumber wagon pulled by four horses could make the trip in 13 hours. The road was impassable for most of each winter. Dr. John L. Roberts first proposed improving the wagon road into a highway in 1915.

The southern region of Monterey County coast was isolated from the few settlements in the north by the steep and rugged terrain. To the south of Posts, there was no road beyond the Pfeiffer Resort and Ranch, only a foot and horseback trail. During the 18th century, the trail began at the Post Ranch and climbed inland to the crest of the coastal ridge. To avoid the steep canyons along the coast, the trail followed the coastal ridge over Anderson Peak and Cone Peak to locations in the south, including  homesteads at Slates Hot Springs, the Harlan and Dani families at Lucia, the mining town of Manchester, and the Plaskett family near what is now known as Gorda.

First post office 

Big Sur’s first post office, named "Posts", was in their house. Confusion ensued when mail intended for the Presidio was sent to Big Sur, and mail for the military post was sent to the local residents. The residents changed the name of the post office to Arbolado (Spanish: 'woodland'), but that was confused by the post office for Alvarado, a street in Monterey. The post office operated at Posts from 1889 to 1910; it was moved in 1905 several miles northwest to the Pfeiffer Ranch Resort in what later became the Big Sur Village. Finally, the English-speaking homesteaders petitioned the United States Post Office in Washington D.C. to change the name of their post office from Arbolado to Big Sur, and the rubber stamp using that name was returned on March 6, 1915, cementing the use of Big Sur as the place name.

After James enlarged his father's cabin in 1877, the family hosted visitors as was the custom of the time until 1910, when a discourteous guest caused his wife to began charging visitors.

W.B. and Anselma's youngest son, Joe, married Rebecca Elizabeth Gilkey, a neighbor of Cherokee descent. Their son Bill continued to lead pack trips into the interior and worked as a cowboy and rancher. Bill was hired to carry the mail from Monterey to Big Sur, and on one of his trips he met Irene Fredericks in Monterey. The couple opened a small resort and café named Rancho Sierra Mar near the Post family home, which they ran with their two children, Billy and Mary. The resort and cafe are now part of the Post Ranch Inn. John Steinbeck was one of the ranch's hired hands in 1920. He wrote a letter to the family thanking them for stagecoach fare back to Salinas. The letter is preserved at the inn as one of the earliest samples of his writing.

Their son Billy, born Joseph William Post III on August 24, 1920, drove cattle as a young man from the ranch to the rail road in Monterey. The trip tool three days. At Malpaso Creek, he had to bring the cattle to the beach and wait for low tide to get the cattle to the other side. Descendants of the Ohlone people, the Post family was recorded on the Census Roll for Indians in 1933 as members of the "Mission Carmel" tribe.

The Post Ranch used to be much larger. To avoid foreclosure, W.B. Post sold part of the ranch west of the Old Coast Road to Russell Fields in 1926. This later became known as Ventana and Coastlands. Long-time Big Sur resident and contractor Sam Trotter built a home there in 1938 at 14 Upper Coastlands.

Billy went to school to become a veterinarian, but college was interrupted by World War II. He joined  the Marine Corps and served in the Pacific. He returned home to run the ranch. Bill married Lynette Hettich on February 12, 1955, and they had two girls, Gayle and Rebecca. When he divorced, he raised the two daughters on his own.

Billy worked for Caltrans as a highway electrician for many years. In the 1960s he met Luci Leonard Lee, a business woman with two daughters. They married in 1969 and in 1973 they returned to Big Sur to help his ailing parents. After their passing, he and Luci moved into the home he had built for his parents, now called the Post House. Later they moved to Carmel Valley.

On January 11, 1972, the Post family sold 200 acres to Big Sur Ventana Corporation, including the Post House which sits on Highway 1 across from the entrance to Post Ranch Inn. The red New England-style house is now a registered historical landmark.

Post Ranch Inn 

It opened in 1992. The idea for the resort came about after Billy retired from Caltrans in 1979. He was talking with wealthy San Francisco lawyer Mike Freed who had bought some land from Post and built a solar-powered vacation house. Billy mentioned that paying taxes on the land had become burdensome and Freed suggested to Billy that he sell Freed a portion of the land and Freed would build a resort. Billy agreed to sell  and become a limited partner in the project. They shook hands on the deal, though Billy added one condition: the other partners had to buy him a new bulldozer so that he could excavate and grade the land himself.

Billy did all of the bulldozer and backhoe site work himself. While he was alive, he led guests on nature walks almost daily and entertained them with stories about his family and the history of the ranch. When he could no longer lead walks, he greeted visitors in the café and told stories there. One of his tales about a supernatural vision that saved his great-grandmother from a wicked storm inspired Thomas Steinbeck, the son of John Steinbeck, to write his first collection of short stories, "Down to a Soundless Sea" (2002). Billy Post was described as "the last cowboy" of the Big Sur region. He died on July 26, 2009 at age 88.

The 41 cabins and cottages at Post Ranch Inn are located along a rocky-ridged cliff overlooking the ocean. The rooms and cottages include ocean-view lodgings with treehouses on stilts and the freestanding Cliff House, which features a deck at the edge of a 1,200-foot-high ocean bluff. Each room is named after a Big Sur homesteader and features a period photo of that individual. The rooms are built from recycled redwood, steel, and stone featuring a modern design incorporating glass and wood stoves. Rooms feature king-size beds, wood-burning fireplaces, indoor or outdoor spa tubs, a private deck, and digital music systems.

The Inn advertises the opportunity for seclusion and reflection. The rooms do not contain televisions or alarm clocks. Guests must be 18 years old or older. It offers meals at the Forbes Travel Guide-rated Four-Star Sierra Mar restaurant. Its wine cellar carries more than 15,000 bottles and 3,200 varying selections. Wine Spectator has awarded the restaurant its Grand Award on several occasions.

A spa features its own products made using locally picked flowers. The Inn offers yoga classes, guided hikes, and stargazing outings.

, a double room is USD $1,823 (£1345.06) per night. Rates include breakfast and valet parking. The Inn loans Lexus cars to guests. A buffet breakfast, minibar in each room, and snacks are included in the room rate. The Inn is owned by Passport Resorts of Sausalito, California.

Post Ranch house 

The original one story, single room home was built in 1867 by W.B. Post at the crown of what was later named Post Grade. The home site is  uphill from the Big Sur River. It was built from native redwood, harvested locally, hand-split, and planed on site. Its style reflects the family patriarch's Connecticut origins in a traditional Saltbox form. There was a roofed shed on the south-east for sleeping. Over time succeeding generations of the Post family expanded the home and made improvements. Joseph W. Post added a two-story wing to the north side of the house in 1877. The house is irregularly shaped and built upon a simple mud sill foundation. It is capped by a series of low and steep pitched gable and shed roofs covered with wood shingle. There were open porches covered by roofs and supported by vertical wood posts on both sides of the building.

The Big Sur Coast Highway was built in front of the house in 1922, necessitating destruction of the original barn and fencing to the north. The home is on the National Register of Historic Places. It is now part of the Ventana Inn resort.

Government 

At the county level, Posts is represented on the Monterey County Board of Supervisors by Mary Adams. In the United States House of Representatives, Posts is in

See also 

 Big Sur
 Pfeiffer Big Sur State Park

References 

This article contains content in the public domain from U.S. government sources.

External links 

  Henry Miller Memorial Library
  Nepenthe
  Post Ranch Inn
 Ventana Inn and Spa

Unincorporated communities in California
Unincorporated communities in Monterey County, California
Populated coastal places in California
Big Sur